The following is a list of local nature reserves in Wales.

References
 Local Nature Reserves in Wales (Public Freedom of Information Act request to the Countryside Council for Wales, made via WhatDoTheyKnow, information released 17 March 2009)